Robert "Bob" Brown (born c. 1944) is a former Canadian football player who played for the Ottawa Rough Riders and BC Lions. He won the Grey Cup in 1968 with Ottawa. He previously played college football at the University of Miami where he was a letter winner in 1963–64.

References

1940s births
Living people
Ottawa Rough Riders players
BC Lions players
Miami Hurricanes football players
Canadian football defensive linemen